Mannobiose can refer to:

 2α-Mannobiose
 3α-Mannobiose